Good–deal bounds are price bounds for a financial portfolio which depends on an individual trader's preferences.  Mathematically, if  is a set of portfolios with future outcomes which are "acceptable" to the trader, then define the function  by

where  is the set of final values for self-financing trading strategies.  Then any price in the range  does not provide a good deal for this trader, and this range is called the "no good-deal price bounds."

If  then the good-deal price bounds are the no-arbitrage price bounds, and correspond to the subhedging and superhedging prices.  The no-arbitrage bounds are the greatest extremes that good-deal bounds can take.

If  where  is a utility function, then the good-deal price bounds correspond to the indifference price bounds.

References

Mathematical finance
Pricing